During the 1936–37 season Bologna Associazione Giuoco del Calcio competed in Serie A, Coppa Italia, Mitropa Cup and International Tournament of 1937 Paris Expo.

Summary 
The club won its second title in a row, defeating Lazio and Torino in an exciting race

After clinched the trophy came 1937 Mitropa Cup, defeating early by Austria Vienna, and winning a friendly tournament in Paris defeating Chelsea in Final.

Squad

Competitions

Serie A

League table

Matches

Coppa Italia

Round of 32

Mitropa Cup

Eightfinals

Statistics

Squad statistics

Players statistics

References

Bibliography

External links 
 
 

Bologna F.C. 1909 seasons
Bologna
Italian football championship-winning seasons